Naidu Thota is a suburb of the city of Visakhapatnam state of Andhra Pradesh, India.

About
It is a residential area, with a college, schools, and Shankar Foundation Eye Hospital nearby.

Transport
It is well connected with Gajuwaka, NAD X Road, Malkapuram, Dwaraka Nagar and Visakhapatnam Steel Plant.

Andhra Pradesh State Road Transport Corporation routes:

References

Neighbourhoods in Visakhapatnam